Heaven Sent is the fifth studio album by Australian pop singer John Paul Young, released in November 1979. The album was produced by Vanda & Young. It peaked at number 95 on the Australian Kent Music Report.

Track listing

Charts

Personnel 
John Paul Young and the Allstars
 John Young/John Paul Young — lead vocals (1975–1981)
 Warren Morgan – piano, backing vocals (1975, 1977–1981)
 Ronnie Peel (aka Rockwell T. James) – bass guitar, rhythm guitar (1975–1979)
 Ian Miller – lead guitar (1977–1979)
 Jacques De Jongh – bass guitar (1978–1979)
 Ray Arnott – drum (1978–1981)
 Tony Buchanan – saxophone (1979)
 Harry Vanda – guitar (1979)
 George Young – guitar (1979)

References 

1979 albums
John Paul Young albums
Albums produced by Harry Vanda
Albums produced by George Young (rock musician)
Albert Productions albums